Chester Township is one of the sixteen townships of Morrow County, Ohio, United States.  The 2010 census found 1,872 people in the township, 228 of whom lived in the village of Chesterville.

Geography
Located in the southeastern part of the county, it borders the following townships:
Franklin Township - north
Middlebury Township, Knox County - northeast corner
Wayne Township, Knox County - east
Liberty Township, Knox County - southeast corner
South Bloomfield Township - south
Bennington Township - southwest corner
Harmony Township - west

The village of Chesterville is located in northern Chester Township.

Name and history
Chester Township was organized in 1812. This township was named after Chester County, Pennsylvania, the native home of a share of the first settlers. It is one of five Chester Townships statewide.

Government
The township is governed by a three-member board of trustees, who are elected in November of odd-numbered years to a four-year term beginning on the following January 1. Two are elected in the year after the presidential election and one is elected in the year before it. There is also an elected township fiscal officer, who serves a four-year term beginning on April 1 of the year after the election, which is held in November of the year before the presidential election. Vacancies in the fiscal officership or on the board of trustees are filled by the remaining trustees.

References

External links
County website

Townships in Morrow County, Ohio
1812 establishments in Ohio
Populated places established in 1812
Townships in Ohio